Eduardo Reyes Ortiz (1 January 1907 – 22 October 1955)  was a Bolivian football forward.

Career 

During his career he made one appearance for the Bolivia national team at the 1930 FIFA World Cup.
He spent his career at the club The Strongest.

Achievements 

First Division - Pre-National Federation Era: 1
 1930

References

External links

1907 births
Year of death missing
Association football forwards
Bolivian footballers
Bolivia international footballers
1930 FIFA World Cup players
The Strongest players